Heike Rusch (born 2 July 1976) is a former professional tennis player from Germany.

Biography
Rusch had success on the junior circuit before playing professionally. She won the Junior Orange Bowl (Under 14s) in 1990 and was a member of Germany's Junior Fed Cup winning team in 1991. Most notably she won the 1993 Australian Open girls' singles title.

On the professional tour, she had a best ranking of 133 in the world, playing her final season in 1995.

ITF finals

Singles (1–1)

References

External links
 
 

1976 births
Living people
German female tennis players
Australian Open (tennis) junior champions
Grand Slam (tennis) champions in girls' singles